Pseudohypertrophy, or false enlargement, is an increase in the size of an organ due to infiltration of a tissue not normally found in that organ. It is commonly applied to enlargement of a muscle due to infiltration of fat or connective tissue, famously in Duchenne muscular dystrophy. This is in contrast with typical muscle hypertrophy, in which the muscle tissue itself increases in size. Because pseudohypertrophy is not a result of increased muscle tissue, the muscles look bigger but are actually weaker. Pseudohypertrophy is typically the result of a disease, which can be a disease of muscle or a disease of the nerve supplying the muscle.

Causes of pseudohypertrophy include muscle diseases: dystrophinopathies, limb-girdle muscular dystrophies, metabolic myopathy, Dystrophic myotonias, Non-dystrophic myotonias, endocrine disorders, parasitic muscle conditions, amyloid and sarcoid myopathy, and granulomatous myositis.

Neurological causes include radiculopathy, poliomyelitis, Charcot-Marie-Tooth disease, spinal muscular atrophy.

Pseudohypertrophy can be broken up into the following roots, suffixes, and prefixes:
 Pseudo means 'false' or 'fake'. The etymology is from the Greek word , which means to lie or deceive.
 hyper means 'extreme' or 'beyond normal'. The etymology is from the Greek word , which means over, above; beyond, to the extreme.
 trophy means 'nourishment', or 'development'. The etymology is from the Greek word , which means food, nourishment.

The term was used by Duchenne de Boulogne in his description of Duchenne muscular dystrophy in one of his works "paralysie musculaire pseudo-hypertrophique."

References 

Symptoms and signs: Nervous system